New Bucks Head is a stadium in Wellington, Shropshire, England and the home of Conference National football club AFC Telford United. It was originally built for Telford United to play at before they went bankrupt. The stadium is on the same site as the original Bucks Head, which had been home to Telford United and Wellington Town for over a century. The stadium was completed in 2003, and has a capacity of 6,300. It is covered on three out of four sides. The stadium lease and assets are currently held by Telford and Wrekin Council.

Until 2020, the stadium regularly hosted Wolverhampton Wanderers F.C. reserve fixtures. When Steven Gerrard returned from injury in the Liverpool Reserves it attracted one of the biggest crowds the stadium has ever seen. The stadium played host to the National youth lions cup final in the 2006–07 season involving Sandiacre Town and Milton United. It has also been used for international football, hosting England U16's against Wales U16's in the Victory Shield.

Sir Stephen Roberts Stand
The Sir Stephen Roberts Stand (Main Stand) is all seated and covered, with capacity for 2,200 spectators. At the top of the stand there are 10 corporate hospitality boxes. The stand houses the club's corporate and press facilities, as well as the gymnasium, swimming pool, bar and brasserie and reception sections of the Telford Whitehouse Hotel. The stand is named after former club chairman Sir Stephen Roberts, an entrepreneurial Shropshire farmer who served as chairman of the Milk Marketing Board for over a decade.

Frank Nagington Stand
The Frank Nagington Stand is situated at the southern end of the stadium. This section was usually only opened when a larger than average crowd, or a particularly large away support, was expected. However it is now open at all games to away fans due to the higher number of travelling fans in the conference.

David Hutchison Stand
The David Hutchison or 'The Hutch' is where the more "die hard" fans stand and is the noisiest part of the stadium on matchdays. It is situated at the northern end of the ground and can hold a capacity of 1,100 spectators.

UEFA Women's U17 Championships England 2013/14
England was the selected country for the U17 Women's championship's in 2013/14. The New Bucks Head Stadium home to AFC Telford United was selected with three other stadiums in England to host the UEFA tournament. AFC Telford United was selected to host the opening ceremony, England's opening game of the tournament and another three group games.

International Fixtures Played at the New Bucks Head

Gallery

References

External links 
Panoramic stadium tour

Sports venues in Shropshire
Football venues in England
Football in Shropshire
Sport in Telford
Sports venues completed in 2003
Buildings and structures in Telford
Wellington, Shropshire
2003 establishments in England
AFC Telford United
Telford United F.C.